Kaarel Liimand (also spelled as Karl Liiman(n); 12 May 1906 Tartu – August 1941 Pskov) was an Estonian painter.

He studied at Pallas Art School.

Further reading
 Šmerl Jassmann, Hilja Läti. Kaarel Liimandi maaliloomingust. Kunst, 1964, nr 1, pp 37–44

Gallery

References

1906 births
1941 deaths
20th-century Estonian painters
20th-century Estonian male artists
People from Rapla
Soviet military personnel killed in World War II